Positionality may refer to:
 Positional good, an economic good whose value is determined by its distribution within a population
 Standpoint theory, a postmodern theory for analyzing inter-subjective discourses

See also 
 Perspectivism, the philosophical view that all ideations take place from particular perspectives, and that there are many possible conceptual schemes in which judgment of truth or value can be made